Kao Koong-lian (born 9 November 1944) is a Taiwanese politician. He was the Vice Chairman and Secretary-General of the Straits Exchange Foundation (SEF) from 2008 to 2014.

ROC Mongolian and Tibetan Affairs Commission Chairmanship

ROC and Tibet Relations Improvement

Speaking at a press conference in Taipei in January 1998, Kao said that the ROC government is willing to enhance relation with Tibetan government-in-exile in India. He added that the commission is willing to provide aids to all Tibetans irrespective of their political belief, and that the ROC government is committed to the reunification of China.

SEF Secretary-General and Vice Chairmanship

20th anniversary of the 1992 Consensus
In November 2012 during a conference commemorating the 20th anniversary of the 1992 Consensus, Kao said that the consensus is a temporary measures to regulate the relations between two sides of the Taiwan Straits in which both sides agreed to set aside differences. However, he emphasized that the two sides need to take another step forward in agreeing to not repudiate each other's jurisdiction and to establish cross-strait comprehensive offices on a reciprocal basis.

He added that SEF is the temporary mediator between two government agencies across the Taiwan Strait. Once all of the communication channel between the two sides have been well-established, SEF may no longer be needed.

He pointed out that over the past two decades, Taiwan identity has changed significantly, adding that Taiwanese identity has been reinforced heavily within Taiwan. This is something that both Beijing and Taipei should guard against.

2013 Mainland China visit
Kao and SEF officials left for Mainland China in mid April 2013 to visit Taiwanese companies operating in Chengdu and Chongqing and meet with senior executives of Taiwanese businesses. He discussed problems they are facing or if there is any assistance SEF can do to help them.

The SEF delegations were still in Sichuan province when the 2013 Ya'an earthquake strike Lushan on 20 April 2013. SEF spokesman said that SEF will offer help to the earthquake relief efforts based on the severity of the disaster.

Cross-strait service trade

In end of June 2013, Kao joined a delegation led by Lin Join-sane, Chairman of Straits Exchange Foundation (SEF), to visit Shanghai from Taiwan for the Cross-Strait Service Trade Agreement signing. The Taiwanese delegation includes Cho Shih-chao, Vice Minister of Economic Affairs and Chang Hsien-yao, Deputy Minister of Mainland Affairs Council.

The cross-strait service trade agreement was signed on 21 June 2013 which consists of four chapters and twenty four articles. Under the agreement, 64 Taiwanese industries will be opened to Chinese Mainland investments, ranging from transportation, tourism and traditional Chinese medicine sectors. Meanwhile, 80 Chinese Mainland industries will be opened to Taiwanese investments, ranging from finance, retail, electronics, publishing and travel sectors.

SEF resignation

On 10 January 2014, Kao tendered his resignation from SEF post and will leave the office on 6 February 2014 with no future posting. His resignation was approved by President Ma Ying-jeou a week earlier.

Later political career
In February 2021, the Kuomintang announced that a proposal to appoint Kao to the party's Central Advisory Committee would be considered during the 21st National Congress.

References

1944 births
Political office-holders in the Republic of China on Taiwan
Living people
Taiwanese people from Fujian
National Chengchi University alumni
Kuomintang politicians in Taiwan